Media and broadcast information/history for the Miami Marlins:

Flagship broadcast outlets
All names/call letters used are those used by the broadcaster the last time the team was broadcast on that outlet.

Television
SportsChannel Florida/Fox Sports Net Florida/FSN Florida/Fox Sports Florida/Bally Sports Florida (1997–present)
Sunshine Network/Sun Sports (1993–1997, 2006–2010)
WBFS-TV (1993–1998)
WAMI-TV (1999–2001)
WPXM-TV (2002–2005)
Marlins Television Network (1993–2005)

Radio

English
WINZ 940 AM (2014–present) – Flagship in Miami
WAXY 790 AM (2008–2013) – Flagship in Miami
WQAM 560 AM (1993–2007) – Flagship in Miami
Marlins Radio Network (1993–present) – Distributes games to radio stations around Florida
XM Satellite Radio (2005–present) – Carries games as part of MLB package

WQAM did not renew the contract with the Marlins when it expired after the 2007 season at the request of the Miami Dolphins. WAXY 790 (The Ticket) signed a contract to become the flagship station for the Marlins.

Spanish
WAQI 710 AM  (present)
WQBA 1140 AM (1998–2008)
WCMQ 1210 AM (1993–1997)

Broadcasters

Television
Joe Angel: TV play-by-play 1997–2000*
Gary Carter: TV analyst 1993–1996
Tommy Hutton: TV analyst 1997–2015, 2021–present
Len Kasper: TV play-by-play 2002–2004
Craig Minervini: Reporter 2002–present
Dave O'Brien: TV play-by-play 1997–2001*
Jay Randolph: TV play-by-play 1993–1996, Pre-game 1997–2000
Cookie Rojas: SAP Analyst 2003–present
Raul Striker, Jr.: SAP play-by-play 2003–present
Preston Wilson: TV analyst 2016
Eduardo Pérez: TV analyst 2016
Al Leiter: TV analyst 2016
Jeff Conine: TV analyst 2016
Rich Waltz: TV play-by-play 2005–2017
Todd Hollandsworth: TV analyst 2017–2021
Paul Severino: TV play-by-play 2018–present

Radio

English
Jesse Agler: Radio studio/Marlins extra host 2006–2007
Joe Angel: Radio play-by-play 1993–2000*
Roxy Bernstein: Radio play-by-play, 2005–2007
Glenn Geffner: Radio play-by-play, 2008–2022
Dave O'Brien: Radio play-by-play, 1993–2000*
Jon Sciambi: Radio play-by-play 1999–2004, Pre-game 1999–2000
Dave Van Horne: Radio play-by-play 2001–2021

Spanish
Manolo Alvarez: Spanish radio play-by-play 1993–1998
Jesus Diaz: Spanish radio play-by-play 1999
Luis Quintana: Spanish radio play-by-play 2002–present
Felo Ramírez: Spanish radio play-by-play 1993–2017
Ángel Rodríguez: Spanish radio play-by-play 2000–2001

See also 
 List of current Major League Baseball announcers

Notes
* Angel & O'Brien split innings doing play-by-play between radio and television for four seasons

References

Florida Marlins: History: Marlins All-Time Broadcasters.  Accessed 12 April 2006.
Florida Marlins: Roster: Broadcasters. Accessed 12 April 2006.
Florida Marlins: Team: Broadcasters. Accessed 1 May 2007.

 
Miami Marlins
Broadcasters
Prime Sports
Fox Sports Networks
Bally Sports